The Taipei Metro  Cailiao station is a station on the Zhonghe–Xinlu Line located in Sanchong District, New Taipei, Taiwan. The station is opened for service on 5 January 2012.

Station overview

This two-level, underground station has an island platform. It is located beneath Chongxin Rd, Sec. 3 between Guangming Rd. and Renhua St. It was scheduled to open in March 2012 along with most of the Xinzhuang Line, but opened for service earlier on 5 January 2012.

Construction
It has three entrances, one accessibility elevator, and two vent shafts. One of the entrances is integrated with a joint development building.

Design
The theme for the station focuses on the simplicity, neatness, and order of a modern city. Glass, aluminum, and enamel are used in the roofs, ceilings, pillars, and walls.

Station layout

Exits
Exit 1: Beside Lane 115, Chongxin Rd. Sec. 1
Exit 2: No. 150, Chongxin Rd. Sec. 3, near Guangmin Rd. 
Exit 3: Chongxin Rd. Sec. 3, near Zhongshan Rd.

Around the station
Sanchong Zhongshan Rd. Post Office
Sanchong District Office
New Taipei City Police Agency, Sanchong Branch
New Taipei City Hospital, Sanchong Branch
Lin Rong-San (between this station and Taipei Bridge station)
Banqiao District Court, Sanchong Court
Sanchong Comprehensive Sports Field
Kuo-Kuang Co. Sanchong station

References

2012 establishments in Taiwan
Zhonghe–Xinlu line stations
Railway stations opened in 2012